Box Hill railway station is one of eight stations on the Johnsonville Branch, a commuter branch railway north of Wellington in New Zealand's North Island.  It serves the suburbs of Khandallah and Te Kainga. It is the only station on the line to be set below street level, and one of four on the line which is on a curve. The station is usually called Box Hill, but is signed as Boxhill on the platform signs.

Electric multiple unit trains are operated under the Metlink brand through this station in both directions to Johnsonville (to the north) and Wellington (to the south).

History 

Box Hill is one of the more recent stations on the Johnsonville Branch, having been opened in 1956.

As part of the Johnsonville line upgrading in 2009–10, the Box Hill Station was closed for about two months from 3 May 2010 while the station platform was resurfaced and extended to the south.

Services 

Trains run in both directions through this station, departing at half-hourly intervals, supplemented by a 13/13/26 schedule at peak times on week days.

The nearest bus routes are #25 and #26 which pass through Khandallah Village.

Facilities 
This station has a single side platform and passenger shelter. Pedestrian access is from Cockayne Road, and from the north end of the platform to Box Hill by a footpath under the adjacent road overbridge. There is no dedicated station car park available.

Footnotes

External links 

 Train timetables from Metlink.

Rail transport in Wellington
Public transport in the Wellington Region
Buildings and structures in Wellington City
Railway stations in New Zealand
Railway stations opened in 1956